Seward Henry Williams (November 7, 1870 – September 2, 1922) was an American lawyer and politician who served one term as a U.S. Representative from Ohio from 1915 to 1917.

Biography
Born in Amsterdam, New York, Williams attended the common schools, the Amsterdam Academy, Williams College, Williamstown, Massachusetts, and Princeton College.
He was graduated in law from Washington and Lee University, Lexington, Virginia, in 1895.
He was admitted to the bar in 1895 and commenced practice the same year.
City solicitor of Lorain, Ohio from 1901 to 1904.
He served as member of the State house of representatives 1910-1913.

Congress 
Williams was elected as a Republican to the Sixty-fourth Congress (March 4, 1915 – March 3, 1917).
He was an unsuccessful candidate for reelection in 1916 to the Sixty-fifth Congress.

Later career and death 
He resumed the practice of law.
He died in Lorain, Ohio, September 2, 1922.
He was interred in Elmwood Cemetery.

Williams married Sarah Jennette Reynolds of Lorain at Cleveland, Ohio on September 29, 1897. They had two children.

He died on September 2, 1922 in Lorain, Ohio.

Memberships
Williams was a Knights Templar Mason and a member of the Knights of Pythias.

References

Sources

1870 births
1922 deaths
People from Amsterdam, New York
People from Lorain, Ohio
Washington and Lee University School of Law alumni
Ohio lawyers
Republican Party members of the Ohio House of Representatives
Williams College alumni
Princeton University alumni
Republican Party members of the United States House of Representatives from Ohio